The 1990 Deutsche Tourenwagen Meisterschaft was the seventh season of premier German touring car championship and also fifth season under the moniker of Deutsche Tourenwagen Meisterschaft. The season had twelve rounds with two races each. It was the first season that all Deutsche Tourenwagen Meisterschaft cars mandatory used the naturally-aspirated engines as turbocharged engines had been banned at the end of 1989, as the governing body felt them to be making the sport dangerous and expensive.

The champion was Hans-Joachim Stuck.

Teams and drivers

References

Deutsche Tourenwagen Masters seasons
1990 in German motorsport
1990 in West German sport